In India, President's rule is the suspension of state government and imposition of direct Union government rule in a state. Under Article 356 of the Constitution of India, if a state government is unable to function according to Constitutional provisions, the Union government can take direct control of the state machinery. Subsequently, executive authority is exercised through the centrally appointed governor, who has the authority to appoint other administrators to assist them. The administrators are usually nonpartisan retired civil servants.

When a state government is functioning correctly, it is run by an elected Council of Ministers responsible to the state's legislative assembly (Vidhan Sabha). The council is led by the chief minister, who is the chief executive of the state; the Governor is only a constitutional head. However, during President's rule, the Council of Ministers is dissolved, vacating the office of Chief Minister. Furthermore, the Vidhan Sabha is either prorogued or dissolved, necessitating a new election.

Prior to 2019, the constitution of the state of Jammu and Kashmir had a similar system of Governor's rule, under its Section 92. The state's governor issued a proclamation, after obtaining the consent of the President of India allowing Governor's rule for a period of up to six months after which President's rule under Article 356 of the Constitution of India can be imposed. After the revocation of Article 370, President's rule applies to Jammu and Kashmir under section 73 (since Article 356 of Constitution of India does not apply to union territories) of Jammu and Kashmir Reorganisation Act, 2019.

Following the 1994 landmark judgment in S. R. Bommai v. Union of India, the Supreme Court of India restricted arbitrary impositions of President's rule.

Chhattisgarh and Telangana are the only states where the President's rule has not been imposed so far.

Imposition in state
In practice, President's rule has been imposed in a state under any one of the following different circumstances:

A state legislature is unable to elect a leader as chief minister for a time prescribed by the Governor of that state, at the Will of Governor.
Breakdown of a coalition leading to the Chief minister having minority support in the house and the Chief minister fails/will definitely fail to prove otherwise, within a time prescribed by the Governor of that state.
Loss of majority in the assembly due to a vote of no-confidence in the house.
Elections postponed for unavoidable reasons like war, epidemic, pandemic or natural disasters.
 On the report of the Governor of the state if said state's Constitutional machinery or legislature fails to abide by Constitutional norms.

If approved by both houses, President's rule can continue for 6 months. It can be extended for a maximum of 3 years with the approval of the Parliament done every 6 months. If the Lok Sabha is dissolved during this time, the rule is valid for 30 days from the first sitting of the Lok Sabha provided that this continuance has already been approved by Rajya Sabha. The 44th Amendment Act of 1978 introduced a new provision to put a restraint on the power of Parliament to extend the President's rule in a state. According to this provision, the president's rule can only be extended over a year every 6 months under the following conditions:
 There is already a national emergency throughout India, or in the whole or any part of the state.
 The Election Commission certifies that elections cannot be conducted in the state.
President's rule can be revoked at any time by the President and does not need Parliament's approval.

Until the mid-1990s, President's rule was often imposed in states through the abuse of authority of Governors who were in collusion with the Union government. The Supreme Court of India in March 1994 established a precedent in S. R. Bommai v. Union of India, due to which such abuse has been drastically reduced.

Imposition in Union territories with a Legislative Assembly

Article 356 is not applicable to Union territories, so there are many ways by which President's rule can be imposed in different Union territories with a Legislative Assembly.

Jammu and Kashmir
Until the revocation of Article 370 and bifurcation into two Union territories, President's rule applied after the application of Governor's rule for 6 months.

After the revocation and bifurcation, the reorganized Union Territory of Jammu and Kashmir is subject to the section 73 of the Jammu and Kashmir Reorganization Act, 2019, which is used to impose President's rule as the Article 356 is not applicable to Union Territories. The provision states:

Delhi 
In NCT of Delhi, President's rule is applied on the basis of Article 239AB of the Constitution of India (as the Article 356 is not applicable to Union Territories) which reads thus:

Puducherry
In the Union Territory of Puducherry, President's rule is applied on the basis of Article 51 of the Government of Union Territories Act, 1963. Which thus reads

Criticism
Article 356 gives wide powers to the Union government to assert its authority over a state if civil unrest occurs and the state government does not have the means to end it. Though the purpose of this article is to give more powers to the Union government to preserve the unity and integrity of the nation, it has often been misused by the ruling parties at the Centre, who used it as a pretext to dissolve state governments ruled by political opponents. Thus, it is seen by many as a threat to the federal state system. Since the adoption of the Indian constitution in 1950, the Union government has used this article several times to dissolve elected state governments by imposing President's rule.

The article was used for the first time in Punjab on 20 June 1951. It was also used in the state of Patiala and East Punjab States Union (PEPSU) and during the Vimochana Samaram to dismiss the democratically elected Communist state government of Kerala on 31 July 1959. In the 1970s and 1980s, it was common for the Union government to dismiss state governments led by opposition parties. The Indira Gandhi regime and post-emergency Janata Party were noted for this practice. Indira Gandhi's government between 1966 and 1977 is known to have imposed President's rule 39 times in different states. Similarly, the Janata Party which came to power after the emergency issued President's rule in 9 states which were ruled by Congress.

The practice was limited only after the Supreme Court established strict guidelines for imposing President's rule in its ruling on the S. R. Bommai v. Union of India case in 1994. This landmark judgement has helped curtail the widespread abuse of Article 356. The judgement established strict guidelines for imposing President's rule. Subsequent pronouncements by the Supreme Court in Jharkhand and other states have further limited the scope for misuse of Article 356. Only since the early 2000s has the number of cases of imposition of President's rule has been drastically reduced.

Article 356 has always been the focal point of a wider debate of the federal structure of government in Indian polity. The Sarkaria Commission Report on Centre-State Relations 1983 has recommended that Article 356 must be used "very sparingly, in extreme cases, as a measure of last resort, when all the other alternatives fail to prevent or rectify a breakdown of Constitutional machinery in the state". Dr. Ambedkar also said that it would be like a "dead letter" (i.e. would be used rarely).

List of instances

See also

 Article 370 of the Constitution of India
 Direct rule
 Federal intervention (A similar procedure used in Argentina)
 Federalism in India
 Part Eighteen of the Constitution of India
 Sarkaria Commission
 State governments of India

References

External links
 Article 355 and 356 text from wikisource
 Discusses the instances where presidents rule has been invoked
 

History of the Republic of India
Politics of India
Parts and articles of the Constitution of India
Federalism in India